Anolis terraealtae, the Les Saines anole or Les Saintes anole, (Anoli des Saintes in French) is a species of anole lizard endemic to the Îles des Saintes, islands in Guadeloupe in the Caribbean.

It was formerly described as a subspecies of A. marmoratus.

References

External links
Anolis terraealtae at the Reptile Database

Anoles
Endemic fauna of Guadeloupe
Lizards of the Caribbean
Reptiles of Îles des Saintes
Reptiles described in 1915
Taxa named by Thomas Barbour